Castellers of London (CoL) is a group of people with an interest in building human towers (castells), a Catalan tradition that dates back more than 200 years, who live in London, England. Many of the people involved in CoL are from Catalonia, but the group also includes people of many nationalities. The goal of CoL is to promote the tradition of castells in the London area by holding open rehearsals and organising special events, such as exhibitions.

In 2015, a group of people experienced in building castells held a series of workshops to promote human towers in London and attract Londoners to attend their rehearsals. They started at Rochester Square Gardens in Camden, moved to Camden Garden, then to Regent's Park and then rehearsed in St Thomas the Apostle church in Arsenal North London. Currently, rehearsals take place in Guy's Hospital Southwark (Wednesday, 7–9 pm) and the Thanet Community Centre (Sunday, 2–5 pm). CoL continues to expand its membership, and currently includes people of different backgrounds and all ages, as well as whole families.

Their debut performance took place during the Youth Fest in Tottenham on 18 July 2015. First pilar of 4 would not happen until 5 September 2015 during the celebration of the Catalan National Day in Kennington Park, Lambeth.

So far CoL are focused on building stable structures six levels tall.

Management 
CoL is an association run by its members and directed by two committees elected during the annual general meeting. These are the Management Committee and the Technical Team, and they are currently represented by the President (Maria Nieto)  and Cap de Colla, the head of the team, (this year shared between Claudia Labrador & Hasier Rodriguez) respectively.

Presidents:

- 2019 Maria Nieto

- 2018 Jordi Bellver

- 2018 Anne D’Hermy

- 2017 Hasier Rodriguez

- 2016 Marc Pujol

- 2015 Marc Pujol

Caps de colla:

- 2019 Claudia Labrador & Hasier Rodriguez

- 2018 Jon Kepa Longarte

- 2017 Stephen (Cuss) Anderson

- 2016 Jan Creixell

- 2015 Jan Creixell

Performances
Castellers of London do few performances a year, highlights being the one for St George's day (usually in Borough Market), one in July around their anniversary and their Christmas diada. They also perform every year together with other international colles in what is called International diada.

Past performances and results can be found in their official website.

The best performance so far was 6 October 2018 in the II International Diada in Tarragona, performing 4d6a, 5d6, i2d6 and 3d6a.

Participation in International "diades"

2016 London
Castellers of London hosted the first International  in Spitalfields Market. Castellers de Paris where the colla invited and they worked together to achieve their best performance to the date.
As the  did not climb, they count as dismantled attempts (id).

Result: (id)3d6, (id)4d6

2016 Tarragona
Tarragona's council invited few international  to perform in Plaça de la Font on Saturday prior to the Concurs de Castells. This time, Castellers d'Andorra and Xiquets Copenhagen were invited together with Castellers of London and Castellers de Paris.
Castellers of London completed for the first time the two structures they could not complete for the previous International diada.

Result: 3d6, 4d6

2017 Paris
To continue with the tradition, Paris invited this time the colles that participated in the latest diada.
Castellers of London completed a new construction, the 4d6a, after two dismantled attempts of the 3d6a in their previous Christmas diada.
This was the first time the  completed a performance with 3 structures of 6 levels, becoming a colla of 6. They would repeat the same performance two more times during that year.

Result: 3d6, 4d6a, 4d6

2018 Tarragona
Performance to take place on 6 October 2018 in Plaça de la Font, Tarragona. Castellers of London performed with Castellers de Paris, Castellers d'Andorra, Xiquets Copenhagen and for the first time, Colla Castellera de Madrid.

Their intention was to do their best diada yet with the 4d6a, 5d6, 2d6 and a p5 at the end. Madrid had the same goal, so both colles went all in with their objectives.

They did a 3d6a in the repetition round and finished with 2 pilars of 4 instead of the planned pilar of 5. This was not an impediment for Castellers of London to do their best performance yet.

Result: 4d6a, 5d6, i2d6, 3d6a

2019 Copenhaguen 
Xiquets Copenhagen organized the International diada of 2019 that took place on 8 June. Apart from Castellers of London, they invited Castellers de París, Castellers d'Andorra, Castellers de Berlín and Colla Castellers d'Edinburgh.

CoL built three structures of 6 (3d6, 4d6 and 3d6a) and their robust p4 to finish. Overall, the 4 structures looked very stable.  One of the highlights of the diada was the 2d6 built by Castellers of Paris for their first time. 

Result: 4d6, 3d6, 3d6a, p4

Structures achieved

 i indicates an attempt that collapsed before it was crowned
 id indicates a dismantled attempt (not crowned but it did not collapse)
 d indicates a completed attempt

References

External links
 Castellers of London on Instagram
 Castellers of London on Facebook
 Castellers of London on Twitter

2015 establishments in England
London
Sports organizations established in 2015
Sports organisations in London